Niksek is a Sepik language of northern Papua New Guinea. The two dialects, Paka and Gabiano, are rather divergent. Niksek is spoken in Niksek village of Niksek/Paka ward in Tunap/Hunstein Rural LLG, East Sepik Province.

References

Sepik Hill languages
Languages of East Sepik Province
Languages of Sandaun Province